Gonzalo García Vivanco (born 25 December 1981) is a Mexican actor in telenovelas and a model. He is best known for his participation in the series Soy tu fan, and for having been the antagonist in the telenovela Relaciones Peligrosas.

Biography 
Gonzalo García Vivanco was born in Guadalajara, Jalisco. He has three brothers, Juan Cristobal, Paul Ignacio, Marco and a sister named Natalia. When he was 10 he moved for a year to Seville, Spain, before returning to Guadalajara. He studied at the Liceo del Valle with an option in theatre.

Career 
From the age of 19, Garcia Vivanco studied for three years at the Center for Studies and Training Actoral (CEFAC) of TV Azteca, later participating in some of the company's television productions, such as the telenovelas Las Juanas, Soñarás and Un nuevo amor. Later he studied at the school of theater CASAZUL and then decided to go to Madrid, Spain, for three years to continue studying acting. While in Spain, he visited several European countries, worked as a waiter, in public relations and as a model, in order to fund his travel.

Filmography

Theater

Awards

References

External links 

Mexican male stage actors
Mexican male telenovela actors
1981 births
Living people
Male actors from Guadalajara, Jalisco
21st-century Mexican male actors